Temple 360 is a web portal which was launched by Meenakshi Lekhi, Minister of Culture, Government of India to do online darshan of Pilgrim Sites in Hinduism. It was launched on the Occasion of Azadi Ka Amrit Mahotsav.

Function 
It allows anyone to visit or do online darshan of 12 Jyotirlinga and 4 Dham anytime from anywhere from India by which the Devotee can perform e-aarti.

References 

Government services web portals in India
Ministry of Culture (India)
Internet properties established in 2022